Edward Hawtrey may refer to:
 Edward Craven Hawtrey, English educationalist and headmaster
 Edward Hawtrey (cricketer), English cricketer and schoolmaster